Matthew Antonio Antonelli (born April 8, 1985) is an American former professional baseball second baseman who played with the San Diego Padres in 2008. He is currently a full-time baseball coach and host of a YouTube channel of baseball instructional videos and discussions about his time as a pro player.

Early life
Antonelli was the Massachusetts Player of the Year in football, was selected to the all-state team in hockey, and was a runner-up for baseball in his senior year at St. John's Prep. He was drafted in the 19th Round of the 2003 Major League Baseball Draft by the Los Angeles Dodgers, he did not sign and instead attended Wake Forest University, where he displayed good plate discipline, walking 57 times as a sophomore, ranking seventh among collegiate hitters. He only struck out 38 times in 232 at-bats, giving him one of the best strikeout-to-walk ratios in the nation. In 2004 and 2005, he played collegiate summer baseball with the Falmouth Commodores of the Cape Cod Baseball League and was named a league all-star in both seasons.

Professional career

San Diego Padres
Antonelli was drafted as a third baseman by the San Diego Padres with the 17th pick of the 2006 Major League Baseball Draft. In July , Antonelli was named the best second base prospect in the minors by Kevin Goldstein of Baseball Prospectus.  In November 2007, Antonelli was ranked as the #1 second base prospect and #27 prospect overall in baseball, on a list polling 20 members of the scouting community and compiled by Jonathan Mayo of minorleaguebaseball.com.

However, he hit 14 home runs in 82 games for High A Lake Elsinore, before moving up to Double A San Antonio Missions to finish the season. In 534 at-bats between the two levels, Antonelli finished with a slash line of .304/.404/.491 with 21 home runs and 25 stolen bases along with a 94/83 K/BB ratio. He won the Texas League Championship with the Missions in 2007.

In 2008, Antonelli played for the Padres' AAA farm club, the Portland Beavers.  He struggled at the plate most of the year, hitting just .215, but kept his good eye and ended up with 76 walks. In August he found some success, hitting .290 for the month, with four home runs and a .393 OBP. Antonelli was called up to the Padres on September 1, 2008, where he promptly laced a single off Greg Maddux of the Dodgers for his first hit in the major leagues.  He then went hitless in his next 20 at bats, but then got 7 hits in his next 13 at-bats with three walks, including his first home run, on September 15, off of Colorado Rockies pitcher Jason Hirsh.

During the 2010 Spring Training period he suffered a Hamate bone injury and then a broken wrist, requiring multiple surgeries. While the club kept him on the official roster he was unable to play, and was granted free agency at the end of the 2010 season. The hand injuries became a chronic issue throughout the rest of his career.

Washington Nationals
He signed as a minor league free agent with the Washington Nationals on December 17, 2010 and spent the season with the AA Harrisburg Senators and AAA Syracuse Chiefs. His wrist injury recurred with a handful of games remaining in the season and he left the team shortly after the conclusion of the season.

Baltimore Orioles
On November 21, 2011, Antonelli signed with the Baltimore Orioles. He was added to the team's 40-man roster. On May 13, 2012, the Orioles designated him for assignment.

New York Yankees
On May 17, the New York Yankees claimed Antonelli off waivers from the Baltimore Orioles. He was designated for assignment on July 1 and released on July 5. His wrist injury woes continued, preventing him from playing a significant amount of game time.

Cleveland Indians
Antonelli signed a minor league contract with the Cleveland Indians in January 2013. He played through spring training, was sent down to Triple-A with the cover story of a fake injury due to Cleveland needing roster spots. After appearing in 3 games with Triple-A Columbus, the Indians informed Antonelli they were going to release him from the team. After receiving minor interest from independent teams he retired on July 17 to take up coaching.

Post-baseball career
After retiring, Antonelli received several calls from independent league teams.  However, he declined all of those offers due to his injury history and his belief he could not make it back to the Major Leagues, and decided to focus on a potential career of coaching.  Antonelli is well known for his YouTube channel, Antonelli Baseball, for which he makes baseball-related videos. Recently, Antonelli has started a Road To The Show series on his channel which gained popularity and slowly spiked his subscriber count. The channel has more than 174,000 subscribers and over 39.323 million views as of May 2021. He also was an assistant baseball coach at the College of the Holy Cross and Wake Forest University. He is married to his wife Laura.

References

External links

Minorleaguebaseball.com profile

Antonelli Baseball on YouTube

1985 births
Living people
Baseball players from Massachusetts
Major League Baseball second basemen
San Diego Padres players
Eugene Emeralds players
Fort Wayne Wizards players
Lake Elsinore Storm players
San Antonio Missions players
Portland Beavers players
Arizona League Padres players
Harrisburg Senators players
Syracuse Chiefs players
Norfolk Tides players
Scranton/Wilkes-Barre Yankees players
Columbus Clippers players
Wake Forest Demon Deacons baseball players
YouTubers from Massachusetts
American people of Italian descent
Falmouth Commodores players
Sports YouTubers